The Anjou Legendarium is a Gothic illuminated manuscript of a collection of stories from the life of saints important to the House of Anjou of Hungary. It was made on the occasion of the journey of Charles I of Hungary and his son Prince Andrew to Naples in Italy in 1330.

The legendarium was a picture book intended for children with a brief text accompanying pictures. The painters of the work came from Bologna and painted in the style of the trecento.

Portions of the manuscript can be found in the Vatican Library, the Morgan Library and the Hermitage Museum. The medieval Legendarium of more than 140 pages contains images and scenes of the life of Jesus Christ, the Hungarian bishop Saint Gerard Sagredo, the prince Saint Emeric of Hungary, the King Saint Ladislaus I of Hungary, the Polish bishop Stanislaus of Szczepanów, Saint Francis of Assisi, Saint Martin, Saint George and of many other legendary Christians.

See also
Saint Ladislaus legend

References

Further reading

Stella Mary Newton, "Tomaso da Modena, Simone Martini, Hungarians and St. Martin in Fourteenth-Century Italy", Journal of the Warburg and Courtauld Institutes, Vol. 43 (1980), pp. 234-238. 
Béla Zsolt Szakács, The Visual World of the Hungarian Angevin Legendary (Central European University Press, 2016). 

Hungarian chronicles
Christian illuminated manuscripts
Gothic art
Collection of the Morgan Library & Museum
Manuscripts of the Vatican Library
Collection of the Hermitage Museum
Illuminated manuscripts of the Louvre